John Bramley (1898 – after 1927), also known as Jack Bramley, was an English professional footballer who played as a right half, centre half or right back. He made 29 appearances in the Football League without scoring.

Career
Born in East Kirkby, Bramley played for Mansfield Town, Welbeck Colliery Welfare, Bradford City, Rotherham County and Sutton Town. For Bradford City, he made six appearances in the Football League. He played 24 matches in senior competition for Rotherham County, including appearing in their last Football League match before the club amalgamated with Rotherham Town to form Rotherham United.

Sources

References

1898 births
Year of death missing
People from East Lindsey District
English footballers
Association football wing halves
Association football defenders
Mansfield Town F.C. players
Welbeck Welfare F.C. players
Bradford City A.F.C. players
Rotherham County F.C. players
Sutton Town A.F.C. players
English Football League players
Date of birth missing
Place of death missing